SH850 or variation may refer to:
Norgestrel, a medication used in birth control pills
List of highways numbered 850, state highways numbered 850